The Feast of the Great Shishlam or Dehwa d-Šišlam Rabba or Nauruz Zūṭa ('Little New Year') is a Mandaean religious holiday that takes place on the 6th and 7th days of Daula, the first month of the Mandaean calendar. It is named after Shishlam, the Mandaean personification of the prototypical priest.

The Night of Power takes place on the night of the 6th day (similar to Qadr Night), during which the heavenly gates of Abatur are open to the faithful. Priests visit Mandaean households and give them myrtle wreaths to hang on their houses for the rest of the year to protect against evil. The households also donate alms (zidqa) to the priests. Similarly, house blessings and door chalking also often take place on Epiphany, a Christian holiday typically celebrated on January 6.

Prayers
In E. S. Drower's version of the Qolasta, prayer 177 is recited for the "Little New Year's Feast" or Dehwa d-Shishlam Rabba.

See also

Epiphany in Christianity, typically celebrated on January 6
Little Christmas, celebrated on January 6
Dehwa Rabba, the Mandaean New Year
Parwanaya
Mandaean calendar

References

Observances on non-Gregorian calendars
Mandaean holidays